Viktor Gjyla (born 11 May 1982) is an Albanian footballer who currently plays as a defender for Shkumbini Peqin in the Albanian Second Division.

References

1982 births
Living people
Sportspeople from Lushnjë
Albanian footballers
Association football defenders
KS Lushnja players
KS Egnatia Rrogozhinë players
FK Partizani Tirana players
KS Shkumbini Peqin players
FK Tomori Berat players
Kategoria Superiore players
Kategoria e Parë players
Kategoria e Dytë players